Hulodes solomonensis is a species of moth of the family Erebidae. It is found on the Solomon Islands.

References

Moths described in 1926
Hulodes
Moths of the Solomon islands